Marius van der Westhuizen (born 6 January 1984) is a South African professional rugby union referee, currently on the Premier Panel of the South African Rugby Referees' Association.

Early career

Van Der Westhuizen was born in Cape Town, South Africa. He started his refereeing career in 2007 and refereed in matches in the  leagues. In 2009, he became a member of SARRA's contenders squad and he took charge of matches in the Craven Week and Under-19 Provincial Championship competitions.

2012 saw him referee in a number of Varsity Cup and Varsity Shield matches, as well as taking charge of three matches during the 2012 Vodacom Cup.

International
Van Der Westhuizen became a referee on the IRB Sevens World Series circuit, where he very quickly established himself as one of the top referees, being the man in charge of the 2013 Hong Kong Sevens final in just his third tournament. He was also named on the refereeing panel for the 2013 Rugby World Cup Sevens in Moscow.

Van Der Westhuizen also officiated at the 2014 Commonwealth Games in Glasgow. as well as at the 2014 IRB Junior World Championship, taking charge of three matches, including the 5th-place play-off semi-final between Australia and Samoa,

Van der Westhuizen refereed at the 2015 Tbilisi Cup to become the 69th test referee for South Africa.

References

Living people
1985 births
South African rugby union referees
Super Rugby referees
SARU referees
Currie Cup referees